Alistair Ivan Shields (born 24 January 1994) is an Irish cricketer. He made his Twenty20 debut for Northern Knights in the 2018 Inter-Provincial Trophy on 18 May 2018. Prior to his Twenty20 debut, he was named in Ireland's squad for the 2012 Under-19 Cricket World Cup. He made his List A debut for Northern Knights in the 2018 Inter-Provincial Cup on 28 May 2018.

References

External links
 

1994 births
Living people
Irish cricketers
Northern Knights cricketers
Place of birth missing (living people)